Vitacura is a commune of Chile located in Santiago Province, Santiago Metropolitan Region. It is one of the most expensive and fashionable areas of Santiago. Inhabitants are primarily high income families. It belongs to the Northeastern zone of Santiago de Chile.

There is an abundance of elite private schools in Vitacura and Las Condes, including Saint George's College, Colegio Santa Úrsula, Alliance Francaise, Colegio La Maisonette, Colegio Tabancura, Colegio Los Andes, Colegio Sagrados Corazones de Manquehue and Colegio San Benito.

The Costanera Norte toll-way connects Vitacura with the international airport and subway stations are located in the neighbor municipality of Las Condes.

Vitacura is the site of ECLAC headquarters, home to the European Southern Observatory (ESO) headquarters in Chile, and home to Santiago's most exclusive shopping street, Avenida Alonso de Córdova.

The Gliders Club of Vitacura can be located in  this commune. With a privileged location, the area is considered to have ideal climate conditions for such types of flights.

Demographics
The population grew by 2.7% (2,124 persons) between the 1992 and 2002 censuses.

Stats
Area: 
Population: 80,598 (2009 projection)
Autonomous household income per capita: US$86,155 (PPP, 2006)
Population below poverty line: 4.4% (±2.5%) (2006)
Regional quality of life index: 86.74, high, 3 out of 52 (2005)
Human Development Index: 0.949, 1 out of 341 (2003)

Administration
As a commune, Vitacura is a third-level administrative division of Chile administered by a municipal council, headed by a mayor (alcalde, in Spanish) who is directly elected every four years. The 2021 mayor is Camila Merino (Evópoli). The communal council has the following members:
 Maximiliano del Real Mihovilovic (RN)
 Felipe Ross Correa (REP)
 Tomás Kast Sommerhoff (Evópoli)
 Paula Domínguez Risopatron (Evópoli)
 Macarena Bezanilla Montes (RN)
 Matías Bascuñán Montaner (UDI)
 Felipe Irarrázaval Ovalle (RN)
 Verónica del Real Card (REP)

Vitacura belongs to Electoral District No. 11 together with the communes of Lo Barnechea, Las Condes, La Reina and Peñalolén and to the VII Senatorial District (Santiago Metropolitan Region).

It is represented in the Chamber of Deputies of the National Congress for the period 2022-2026 by the following deputies:
 Guillermo Ramírez Diez (UDI)
 Gonzalo de la Carrera Correa (REP)
 Cristían Araya (politician) (REP)
 Catalina del Real Mihovilovic (RN)
 Francisco Undurraga Gazitúa (Evópoli)
 Tomás Hirsch Goldschmidt (Humanist Action)

Shopping
This commune is one of the most expensive and fashionable areas of Santiago and boutiques of many world's leading luxury retailers are located in Vitacura. These stores include Louis Vuitton, Armani, Tommy Hilfiger, Swarovski, Salvatore Ferragamo, Ermenegildo Zegna, Brooks Brothers, Hermès, MaxMara, Bang & Olufsen, and Hugo Boss, as well as many others.

Education

The main campus of the Lycée Antoine-de-Saint-Exupéry de Santiago, a French international school, is in Vitacura.

The Deutsche Schule Santiago (or Colegio Alemán de Santiago) maintains the Vitacura campus, which houses students in years one through six.

Chartwell International School, Preschool and Primary school located in the Lo Curro region of Vitacura.

References

External links

  Municipality of Vitacura

Populated places in Santiago Province, Chile
Geography of Santiago, Chile
Communes of Chile
Populated places established in 1946
1946 establishments in Chile